Badamia is an Indoaustralian  genus of skipper butterflies containing two species. The larvae feed on Terminalia (Combretaceae).

Species
The genus includes the following species:

 Badamia atrox (Butler, 1877) (Fiji)
 Badamia exclamationis (Fabricius, 1775)

References
 de Jong, R. & Treadaway, C. G. 2007 Hesperiidae of the Philippine Islands. In Butterflies of the World, Supplement 15 (ed. E. Bauer & T. Frankenbach), pp. 1–72. Keltern: Goecke & Elvers.
 Parsons M. 1999. The butterflies of Papua New Guinea: their systematics and biology. Academic Press, San Diego.
 Tennent, W. J. 2002. Butterflies of the Solomon Islands: systematics and biogeography. Storm Entomological Publications, Dereham, Norfolk, U. K.

External links

 Badamia at funet
 Images representing Badamia at Consortium for the Barcode of Life

Coeliadinae
Butterflies of Indochina
Hesperiidae genera
Taxa named by Frederic Moore